The Butte Business College was a school in Butte, Montana from 1890 to 1975.

References

Educational institutions established in 1890
1890 establishments in Montana
Defunct universities and colleges in Montana